Civic Ghana is a module of NABCO, an initiative set up by the government of Ghana to address graduate unemployment. Its goal is to train graduates to network and promote their services by utilizing social spaces in public and private institutions.

References 

Unemployment in Ghana
Government of Ghana